
Hiding from the Landlord is a twenty-four track compilation album by the Irish post-punk band Five Go Down to the Sea?. It was released in April 2020 on vinyl and CD by Allchival records, an imprint of AllCity Records.

The album was accompanied by a twenty-page fanzine with contributions from Elvira Butler, Cathal Coughlan of Microdisney, Pete Astor of The Weather Prophets, Gavin Friday of the Virgin Prunes, and writers John Robb, Kevin Barry, Declan Lynch and Cónal Creedon. The track listing was compiled by documentary producer Paul McDermott and John Byrne, who also authored the fanzine. The release contains the first official release of "Knocknaheeny Shuffle", which was recorded live during the Knot A Fish sessions, but had only survived on cassette copies.

Track listing
All songs recorded as Five Go Down to the Sea? unless otherwise indicated.

 There's A Fish On Top Of Shandon (Swears He's Elvis) – 02:43 
 The Woodcutter Song – 02:36   
 Lorry Across the Lee – 02:14 
 Fishes For Compliments – 03:40 
 What Happened Your Leg? – 02:12 
 Day Tripper – 02:54 (as Beethoven)
 Blue Moon – 03:48 
 Knocknaheeny Shuffle – 02:45 
 Wince – 02:58 (as Beethoven)
 While My Cigar Gently Streeps – 00:47 
 Alyunt – 03:06 (as Nun Attax)
 Why Wait Until April
 The Glee Club – 02:49 
 Reekus Sunfare – 04:36 (as Nun Attax)
 Jumping Joley – 02:36 
 Edelweiss – 01:56 (as Nun Attax)
 Often – 02:39
 Aunt Nelly – 03:25 
 White Cortina – 02:58 (as Nun Attax)
 Channel Blocks – 02:33 (as Beethoven)
 Are You A Horse? – 03:04 
 Boon For Travellists – 02:41 
 Elephants For Fun And Profit – 02:20 
 Another Spark – 02:22

Personnel
 Finbarr Donnelly – lead vocals, lyrics (1978–1989)
 Ricky Dineen – guitar, bass (1978–1989)
 Philip O'Connell – bass (1978–1985)
 Keith O'Connell – drums (1978–1985)
 Mick Finnegan – guitar (1979)
 Giordaí Ua Laoghaire – guitar (1979-1980)
 Mick Stack – guitar (1982-1985)
 Úna Ní Chanainn – cello (1982-1983)
 Daniel Strittmatter – drums (1985-1989)
 Maurice Carter – bass (1988-1989)

Footnotes

Citations

Sources

External links
 Five Go Down To The Sea? Facebook page

2020 albums
Five Go Down to the Sea? albums